Wabash Township is one of thirteen townships in Parke County, Indiana, United States. As of the 2010 census, its population was 818 and it contained 353 housing units.

History
When General William Henry Harrison took an army from Vincennes to the Battle of Tippecanoe in late 1811, Zachariah Cicott served as a scout. Cicott was familiar with the area because of his time trading up and down the Wabash River starting circa 1801. The trail taken by Harrison's army passed through the area that later became Parke County on its way to and from the battle site in Tippecanoe County. The settlement of Armiesburg was so named because Harrison and his army crossed the Raccoon Creek and camped near there on their way to the battle.

The Phillips Covered Bridge and Sim Smith Covered Bridge were listed on the National Register of Historic Places in 1978.

Geography

Cities, towns, villages
 Mecca
 Montezuma (south edge)

Unincorporated towns
 Arabia at 
 Armiesburg at 
 Bradfield Corner at 
 Midway at 
(This list is based on USGS data and may include former settlements.)

Cemeteries
The township contains these four cemeteries: Arabia, Armiesburg, Hixon and Watts.

Major highways
  U.S. Route 36
  U.S. Route 41

School districts
 Southwest Parke Community School Corporation

Political districts
 State House District 42
 State Senate District 38

References
 
 United States Census Bureau 2009 TIGER/Line Shapefiles
 IndianaMap

Bibliography

External links
 Indiana Township Association
 United Township Association of Indiana
 City-Data.com page for Wabash Township

Townships in Parke County, Indiana
Townships in Indiana